The Muskogee Civitan Open was a golf tournament on the LPGA Tour from 1962 to 1965. It was played at the Muskogee Country Club in Muskogee, Oklahoma.

Winners
1965 Susie Maxwell
1964 Mickey Wright
1963 Mickey Wright
1962 Patty Berg

References

Former LPGA Tour events
Golf in Oklahoma
Muskogee, Oklahoma
Recurring sporting events established in 1962
Recurring sporting events disestablished in 1965
1962 establishments in Oklahoma
1965 disestablishments in Oklahoma
Women's sports in Oklahoma